BRAVO TV is a German television program which aired from January 1985 till December 1986 on Sat.1 and from May 1993 till December 2002 on RTL II. In February 2003 the ZDF took over the show, but it was cancelled due to bad ratings in November 2004. The show later had a short-lived revival on ProSieben and was aired again for the first time on November 5, 2005. In May 2007 it was cancelled for good.

The television show covered similar topics as the BRAVO print magazine. It usually included detailed music charts, more-or-less prominent guests, sexual education topics and a music video selected by the viewers at the end of the show.

BRAVO TV was hosted by the following presenters:

 Kristiane Backer (1993-1995) 
 Heike Makatsch (1995-1996) 
 Jasmin Gerat (1996-1997) 
 Lori Stern (1997-1998) 
 Nova Meierhenrich with Kerstin Kramer and Florian Wahlberg (1998-1999) 
 Enie van de Meiklokjes (1999-2001) 
 Collien Fernandes and Sebastian Höffner (2001-2002) 
 Mia Aegerter (2004) 
 Ben (2005-2006)
 Gülcan (2006-2007)

Sat.1 original programming
RTL Zwei original programming
ZDF original programming
ProSieben original programming
1985 German television series debuts
2007 German television series endings
German music television series
1990s German television series
German-language television shows